Autophradates (Ancient Greek:  , lived 4th century BC) was a Persian Satrap of Lydia, who also distinguished himself as a general in the reign of Artaxerxes III and Darius III.

Rule as a satrap of Lydia
During the reign of the Artaxerxes II, Autophradates captured Artabazus, the satrap of Lydia and Ionia who had revolted against the Persian king, and made him his prisoner, but afterwards was forced to set him free.

Autophradates was also directed by Artaxerxes to put down the rebellion of the satrap of Cappadocia Datames. He went with a large army, but was obliged to retreat with heavy loss.

Autophradates later joined the Revolt of the Satraps.

Resistance to Alexander the Great
Autophradates participated to the Achaemenid resistance against the campaigns of Alexander the Great in Asia Minor. Together with Pharnabazus III he supported militarily and financial the king of Sparta Agis III who was organizing resistance against the Macedonians. After the death of the Persian admiral, Memnon, in 333 BC, Autophradates and Pharnabazus III, satrap of neighbouring Hellespontine Phrygia, undertook the command of the fleet, and reduced Mytilene, the siege of which had been begun by Memnon. Pharnabazus now sailed with his prisoners to Lycia, and Autophradates attacked the other islands in the Aegean sea which supported Alexander the Great. But Pharnabazus soon after joined Autophradates again, and both sailed against Tenedos, which was induced by fear to surrender to the Persians.

Tomb of Payava

Autophradates appears as a seated satrap in audience on the tomb of the Lycian dignitary Payava, now visible in the British Museum. Arthur Hamilton Smith in the British Museum catalogue describes the scene as follows:

Coinage
The coinage of Autophradates shows the portrait of the satrap, and uses the legend "ΟΑΤΑ" in Greek script as an abbreviation for his name in Greek (ΟΑΤΑΦΡΑΔΑΤΗΣ).

See also
List of satraps of Lydia

Notes

References
Smith, William; Dictionary of Greek and Roman Biography and Mythology, "Autophradates" , Boston (1867)

Opponents of Alexander the Great
4th-century BC people
4th-century BC Iranian people
Military leaders of the Achaemenid Empire
Achaemenid satraps of Lydia